Gigantour was a sporadically organised traveling heavy metal music festival organized by Dave Mustaine of Megadeth. The tour was founded in 2005 with dates across North America (see also Gigantour 2005), and the 2006 and 2007 line-ups also traveled to Australia. The bands appearing at the festival were chosen by Mustaine. The tour is set as an alternative to tours such as Ozzfest. The name "Gigantour" was inspired by the classic 1960s anime Gigantor, of which Mustaine is a fan. The most recent Gigantour took place in 2013.

The Festival
The lineup of the inaugural Gigantour was composed of bands that Dave Mustaine particularly enjoyed touring with in the past. Mustaine invited Dream Theater, Nevermore and Overkill. The subsequent editions of Gigantour also featured Mustaine's personal choices, such as Anthrax, The Dillinger Escape Plan, and Fear Factory.

Festival album
A live album culled from Gigantour festival shows in Montreal (September 2, 2005) and Vancouver (September 9, 2005) was released on CD on August 22, 2006, and on DVD on September 5, 2006. The album has performances by Megadeth, Dream Theater, Anthrax, Fear Factory, Life of Agony, Nevermore, Dry Kill Logic, Symphony X and Bobaflex.

Gigantour 2: North America (2006)

Line-up

Main stage
Megadeth, Lamb of God, Opeth, Arch Enemy

Second stage
Overkill, Into Eternity, Sanctity, The SmashUp

Tour dates

Notable events

Guest singers
At the September 23 show in Columbus, Ohio, Angela Gossow joined Megadeth onstage during the second half of "Peace Sells". Earlier in the show, during Overkill's final song, two members of Lamb of God joined them onstage..

At the September 25 show in Toronto, Angela Gossow, Randy Blythe, and Bobby "Blitz" Ellsworth joined Megadeth on stage and sang the final part of "Peace Sells" with him.

Lack of a second stage on some tour stops
At the September 9 show in San Diego, September 13 show in Phoenix, Arizona, September 24 in Clarkston, Michigan, and September 29 show in Boston there was no second stage. The bands that performed were, in order of appearance, Overkill, Arch Enemy, Opeth, Lamb of God, and Megadeth.

Mike Portnoy jams with Overkill

September 30, 2006 – Holmdel
Mike Portnoy from Dream Theater joined Overkill on stage for their song "Elimination".

Molson Amphitheater
While playing in the September 25 show in Toronto, Canada towards the beginning of Megadeth's set, Dave Mustaine had some technical problems relating to his guitar, resulting in him throwing it across the stage and walking off. The band then finished the song without Mustaine, and then followed him offstage. After fifteen minutes of chanting from the crowd, Megadeth finally returned to the stage, and with a brief apology from Dave, continued playing through their set.

Salt Lake City/Ecenter
While Lamb of God was on stage performing, someone spilled beer all over the soundboard, which did not interfere with Lamb of God's set. However, Megadeth received some technical problems during their second set. Dave Mustaine got angry and threatened to "beat the hell out of whoever did it" and asked the crowd to bring the culprit to him. Dave then walked off stage for roughly 20 minutes until the problem was fixed. This can be seen in the special features of the Gigantour 2 DVD.

Gigantour 2: Australia (2006)

Line-up
Megadeth, Soulfly, Arch Enemy, Caliban

Tour dates

Gigantour 3: Australia (2007)

Line-up
Megadeth, Static-X, Lacuna Coil, DevilDriver, Bring Me the Horizon

Tour dates

Gigantour 3: UK (2008)

Line-up
Megadeth, Job for a Cowboy, Evile

Tour dates

Gigantour 3: North America (2008)

Line-up
Megadeth, In Flames, Children of Bodom, Job for a Cowboy, High on Fire.

Dave Mustaine wanted a shorter lineup so each band had a chance to put on a show.

Tour dates

Gigantour 4 (2012)

Line-up
Megadeth confirmed, on September 27, 2011, that Motörhead, Volbeat, and Lacuna Coil would be included in the next Gigantour that was set for early 2012.

Tour dates
Megadeth announced, on November 2, 2011, Gigantour 2012 tour dates .

Gigantour 5 (2013)

Line-up
Megadeth, Black Label Society, Device, Hellyeah, Newsted, and Death Division

Tour dates

Notable incidents
Due to frontman Jason Newsted being diagnosed with walking pneumonia, Newsted dropped off the bill from July 22–29.

On the last show of the tour, Newsted joined Megadeth to sing vocals on Metallica's "Phantom Lord" (A song originally written by Dave).

Gigantour history summary

Discography

CD releases
 Gigantour (2006)
 Gigantour, Vol. 2 (2008)

DVD releases
 Gigantour (2006)
 Gigantour 2 (2008)

References

External links
Gigantour official website
Gigantour 2006 at MySpace
Megadeth official website
Interview with Dave Mustaine, The Sydney Morning Herald, 2006

Heavy metal festivals in the United States
Megadeth concert tours
Heavy metal festivals in North America